No. 261 Squadron RAF was a squadron of the Royal Air Force during World War I and World War II. It was involved in the defence of Malta from August 1940 till May 1941 and the campaign in Burma.

History

Formation and World War I
The squadron first formed officially on 20 August 1918 at Felixstowe from Nos. 339, 340 and 341 flights of the former RNAS, and continued to operate their Felixstowe F.3 flying-boats on anti-submarine and anti-shipping patrols. After the armistice it was officially disbanded on 13 September 1919.

Reformation and World War II
The squadron was reformed on 2 August 1940 to combine the two flights operating in the defence of Malta, the two flights Malta Fighter Flight operating the Gloster Sea Gladiator and No. 418 Flight RAF operating Hawker Hurricanes. Among the inherited aircraft were the two survivors of the three Gladiators supposedly named Faith, Hope and Charity, Charity had been shot down the week before the squadron formed. The squadron suffered badly from attacks by both German and Italian aircraft and when a relief squadron (No. 185 Squadron) arrived in Malta the squadron was disbanded and the remnants were absorbed into No. 185 Squadron between 12 and 21 May 1941.

Reformed again
The squadron was reformed at RAF Habbaniya, Iraq on 12 July 1941 by renumbering No. 127 Squadron and again was equipped with Gladiators and Hurricanes. The main role was the defence of the oil ports, when fighting in Iraq ended the squadron sent detachments to Palestine and Cyprus. The squadron moved to Haifa, Palestine in January 1942. Re-equipped with the Hurricane IIB the squadron moved to the far east in early 1942 to join the campaign in Burma. The first action was February 1943 when the squadron was used in the ground attack role. It also undertook escort duties to the Douglas Dakota operating supply missions. The squadron re-equipped with the Republic Thunderbolt in 1944 and returned to action in September 1944 to join an attack on Rangoon. It fought to the end of the Burma campaign and it had moved to India to re-group ready to join the action in Malaya as the war ended. The squadron was disbanded on 26 September 1945 at RAF Tanjore, India.

Aircraft operated

Surviving aircraft
The fuselage of Gladiator Faith is on display at the Malta War Museum, Fort St Elmo, Valletta.

See also
List of Royal Air Force aircraft squadrons

References

Notes

Bibliography

 Bowyer, Michael J.F. and John D.R. Rawlings. Squadron Codes, 1937–56. Cambridge, UK: Patrick Stephens Ltd., 1979. .
 Crawford, Alex. Gloster Gladiator. Redbourn, UK: Mushroom Model Publications, 2002. .
 Flintham, Vic and Andrew Thomas. Combat Codes: A full explanation and listing of British, Commonwealth and Allied air force unit codes since 1938. Shrewsbury, Shropshire, UK: Airlife Publishing Ltd., 2003. .
 Halley, James J. The Squadrons of the Royal Air Force & Commonwealth 1918–1988. Tonbridge, Kent, UK: Air Britain (Historians) Ltd., 1988. .
 Jefford, C.G. RAF Squadrons, a Comprehensive record of the Movement and Equipment of all RAF Squadrons and their Antecedents since 1912. Shrewsbury, Shropshire, UK: Airlife Publishing, 1988 (second edition 2001). .
 Rawlings, John D.R. Coastal, Support and Special Squadrons of the RAF and their Aircraft. London: Jane's Publishing Company Ltd., 1982. .
 The Illustrated Encyclopedia of Aircraft (Part Work 1982–1985), Orbis Publishing, UK.

External links

261
No. 261
Military of British Ceylon
1918 establishments in the United Kingdom
Military units and formations of Ceylon in World War II
Military units and formations in Mandatory Palestine in World War II
Military units and formations established in 1918
Military units and formations disestablished in 1945